Beatus was the second bishop of Passau from 746/747 to approximately 754AD.

Although Beatus is not listed in any of the many bishops' lists, his existence is beyond doubt due to recent research.

References

Year of birth unknown
Date of death unknown
Roman Catholic bishops of Passau
8th-century bishops in Bavaria